James Munro  (11 October 1826 – 5 February 1871) was a Scottish recipient of the Victoria Cross, the highest and most prestigious award for gallantry in the face of the enemy that can be awarded to British and Commonwealth forces.

He was 20 when he joined up, and by 1854 he was a sergeant serving in the Crimean War. Eighteen months later, his regiment went to India and in 1857 Munro was promoted to colour sergeant.

James Munro received his medal from Queen Victoria at Windsor Castle in 1860, two years after he was discharged due to illness caused by his wounds.

Details
Munro was about 30 years old, and a colour-sergeant in the 93rd Regiment of Foot (Sutherland Highlanders), British Army during the Indian Mutiny when the following deed took place on 16 November 1857 at the Lucknow, India for which he was awarded the VC:

The medal
His Victoria Cross is displayed at the Argyll and Sutherland Highlanders Museum, Stirling Castle, Scotland.

See also
 Clan Munro

References

Monuments to Courage (David Harvey, 1999)
The Register of the Victoria Cross (This England, 1997)
Scotland's Forgotten Valour (Graham Ross, 1995)

External links
History of Argyll & Sutherland Highlanders

British recipients of the Victoria Cross
Argyll and Sutherland Highlanders soldiers
1826 births
1871 deaths
British Army personnel of the Crimean War
Indian Rebellion of 1857 recipients of the Victoria Cross
People from Ross and Cromarty
British Army recipients of the Victoria Cross
Scottish military personnel